Kandel is a town in the Germersheim district of Rhineland-Palatinate, Germany, near the border with France and approximately 18 km north-west of Karlsruhe, and 15 km south-east of Landau.

Kandel is twinned with the small Lancashire town of Whitworth.

Kandel is the seat of the Verbandsgemeinde ("collective municipality") Kandel.

Coat of arms meaning
Star: Celestial goodness, noble person, leadership, excellence.

Sword: Justice and military honour.

Sky-Blue (Azure): Truth and loyalty.
The following overview contains important personalities with reference to Kandel (Pfalz) '' ', arranged by honorary citizens, person born in the city, or who have worked in Kandel. The list does not claim to be complete.

Honorary Citizens 
 1980: Maria Wiesheu (Sister Himeria), a member of the Order of the Sisters of the Divine Redeemer, a province of Palatinate, Esthal, a long time active as a nurse in Kandel
 1991: Oskar Böhm († 2001), 1955-1989 Mayor of the city of Kandel, 1972-1981 Mayor of the Association of Kandel

Sons and daughters of the city

Before 1900 
 Franz Michael Leuchsenring (1746-1827), author

20th century 

 Horst Schütz (born 1951), cyclist
 Ingrid Persohn (born 1952), cyclist and three-time German champion
 Nadine Härdter (born 1981), handball player
 Manuel Hornig (born 1982), soccer player
 Pascal Ackermann (born 1994), cyclist
 Petrissa Solja (born 1994), table tennis player

Persons who have worked on the ground 

 Albert Hilger, (1839-1905), completed on the spot starting from 1854 a pharmacist teaching

References

External links
 

Germersheim (district)